The 2017–18 Presbyterian Blue Hose women's basketball team represents Presbyterian College in the 2017-18 NCAA Division I women's basketball season. They were led by second-year coach Todd Steelman. They were members of the Big South Conference. They finished the season 12–18, 9–9 in Big South play to finish in fifth place. They lost in the quarterfinals of the Big South women's basketball tournament to High Point.

Roster

Schedule

|-
!colspan=9 style=""|Non-conference regular season
|-

|-
!colspan=9 style=""|Big South regular season
|-

|-
!colspan=9 style=""|Big South tournament

Schedule source:

See also
2017–18 Presbyterian Blue Hose men's basketball team

References

Presbyterian Blue Hose women's basketball seasons
Presbyterian
Presbyterian
Presbyterian